Uragan Ivano-Frankivsk (People Football Club "Uragan" Ivano-Frankivsk), is a futsal team from Ivano-Frankivsk, Ukraine.

The team was founded in 2002, and after two years was promoted from the second league to the first.

Honors

Domestic
 Ukrainian Championship (2):
 2010–11, 2020–21

 Ukrainian Cup (2):
 2018–19, 2019–20

UEFA Club Competitions Record

UEFA Futsal Cup

External links
  Official web site of the team
  Team's info on official web site of the Futsal Assotiation of Ukraine

Futsal clubs in Ukraine
Sport in Ivano-Frankivsk
2002 establishments in Ukraine